This is a list of all United States Supreme Court cases from volume 536 of the United States Reports:

External links

2002 in United States case law